Signal-transducing adaptor protein 1 is a protein that in humans is encoded by the STAP1 gene.

Function 

The protein encoded by this gene functions as a docking protein acting downstream of Tec tyrosine kinase in B cell antigen receptor signaling. The protein is directly phosphorylated by Tec in vitro where it participates in a positive feedback loop, increasing Tec activity. A mouse ortholog, stem cell adaptor protein 1, shares 83% identity with its human counterpart.

Interactions 

STAP1 has been shown to interact with C19orf2.

References

Further reading